Daniel Wallace (May 9, 1801 – May 13, 1859) was a U.S. Representative from South Carolina.

Born near Laurens, South Carolina, he moved to Union County in 1833.  He was a major general of the State militia.   He studied law and engaged in agricultural pursuits. After being admitted to the bar, the practiced law in Union and Jonesville, Union County, South Carolina.  He was elected to the State house of representatives in 1846 and served until 1847.

Wallace was elected as a Democrat to the Thirtieth Congress to fill the vacancy caused by the death of James A. Black.  He was reelected to the Thirty-first and Thirty-second Congresses and served from June 12, 1848, to March 3, 1853.

After leaving Congress, he resumed his agricultural pursuits.  He died in Jonesville, South Carolina, May 13, 1859 and was interred in Old Presbyterian Cemetery, Union, South Carolina.  His son was General William Henry Wallace of the Confederate States Army, Speaker of the South Carolina House of Representatives, and Circuit Judge.

References

1801 births
1859 deaths
American militia generals
Democratic Party members of the South Carolina House of Representatives
Democratic Party members of the United States House of Representatives from South Carolina
19th-century American politicians
People from Laurens, South Carolina
People from Union County, South Carolina